The AMP-69 (Autómata Módosított Puskagránátos) is a selective-fire gas-operated 7.62×39mm assault rifle that was manufactured by Fegyver- és Gépgyár. 

It was specially created to fire rifle grenades with blank cartridges.

See also
AK-63
AMD-65
List of assault rifles

References

7.62×39mm assault rifles
Kalashnikov derivatives
Assault rifles of Hungary
Fegyver- és Gépgyár firearms